Christian Münzner (born 21 August 1981) is a German guitarist who plays for the bands Obscura and Alkaloid. He is also known for playing for the technical death metal band Necrophagist from 2002 until 2006, appearing on their 2004 release Epitaph. As well as Necrophagist, Münzner played in Defeated Sanity from 1999 to 2002 and Obscura from 2008 to 2014, after which he left to co-found the extreme progressive metal supergroup Alkaloid. He rejoined Obscura in 2020.

In addition to being a prolific solo artist who has released three solo albums, Münzner is also a member of Ron Jarzombek's musical venture Terrestrial Exiled and was featured on Hannes Grossmann's solo album.

In recent years, he has focal dystonia in his left hand.

Münzner is known for drawing huge influences from classical music, particularly Johann Sebastian Bach.

Early life

Münzner began playing guitar aged 11, began playing his first live shows when he was just 12, and soon thereafter was introduced to the work of Yngwie Malmsteen, Steve Vai, Dream Theater, and Paul Gilbert. After seeing Gilbert perform, he developed a habit of practicing rigorously for 6–8 hours a day. In 2001 he attended the Munich Guitar Institute and studied with Wolfgang Zenk and Uli Wiedenhorn, before graduating in 2002.

Influences and style

His playing style is largely based on neo-classical scales, such as diminished, phrygian, harmonic minor. He cites many neoclassical guitar players as major influences, such as Tony MacAlpine, Jason Becker who inspired his sweep picking technique, Marty Friedman, Yngwie Malmsteen, Vinnie Moore, and John Petrucci, who also inspired his alternate picking technique.

In regards to guitar technique, he says:

He wrote half the leads on Necrophagist's Epitaph, although he believes that "his phrasing wasn't as good as now as I tended to overplay".

He's also a fan of symmetric and exotic scales, and he openly endorses using his knowledge of music theory when writing: "It helps me a lot to see and navigate through the fret-board a lot faster. [...] I think knowing all the theory also made me learn every other aspect of guitar a lot faster."

Music

Necrophagist

Münzner joined Necrophagist in 2002, and wrote the solos to the Epitaph album, including songs like "Stabwound" and the title track. The album garnered critical acclaim amongst fans and critics alike for the complexity of the music and its substantive neoclassical influences. Münzner's tenure at Necrophagist lasted only four years, and in 2006 he left the band. However, he later stated that there was a lot of tension within the band, "which sucked out the fun of guitar playing", which prompted him to leave. In regards to his relationship with Muhammed and the contribution he made to the record, Münzner states:

After leaving the band, Necrophagist announced that Münzner's departure was due to scheduling conflicts.

Obscura

Shortly after leaving Necrophagist, Münzner joined Steffen Kummerer, Jeroen Paul Thesseling and Hannes Grossmann in Obscura, recording his first album with them, Cosmogenesis, in 2009. Two years later, he recorded the third Obscura record, Omnivium, in 2011. Throughout his tenure, the band played more than 200 lives shows. Münzner stated that a large reason for his departure from Necrophagist and eagerness to join Obscura was because of the freedom afforded to him by this band, particularly Steffen Kummerer who welcomed his contributions.

When writing for Obscura, Münzner stated that his main contributions were not so much in terms of songwriting, but generating riffs and solos for the band, which were then arranged by Grossmann. Apart from the song "Universe Momentum", Münzner said that he had not written any songs on his own, but relied on writing riffs and solos which were then organized into songs.

He appeared in the music video for the single "Anticosmic Overload".

During his time with Obscura, Münzner began developing focal dystonia, which prohibited some of his playing and made touring exhaustive. Citing Obscura's extreme technicality and touring as a hindrance to this disease, Münzner decided to leave the band prior to the release of their fourth record.

Alkaloid

After leaving Obscura, Münzner joined Morean, Danny Tunker, Linus Klausenitzer and Hannes Grossmann as the third guitarist, forming the progressive metal supergroup Alkaloid in 2014, and wrote two songs for their debut album, The Malkuth Grimoire.

Focal dystonia

After recording the Obscura album Omnivium in 2011, Münzner was diagnosed with focal dystonia. Despite having had this disorder for several years throughout his career, physicians couldn't characterize the disease. Münzner describes the disorder as impairing the coordination between both his index and middle fingers, making the technical demands of his music impossible, forcing him to change his fingering and technique.

Despite the disease, Münzner still wrote music and toured with Obscura until his departure from the band.

Equipment
Guitars
Ibanez RGT6EXFX
Ibanez JEM77BFP
Ibanez XPT707 seven string
Ibanez JEM77V
Ibanez RGD2127Z-ISH 7 string
Ibanez RGA7 7 string

Amplifiers
ENGL E 530 preamp
ENGL 840/50 poweramp

Guitar picks
Dunlop Jazz III

Effects
TC Electronic G Major multi-effects unit
Fractal Audio Axe FX II

Discography

 Defeated Sanity - Promo (2000)
 Defeated Sanity - Talk Evolution/The Parasite (2001)
 Necrophagist - Epitaph (2004)
 Obscura - Cosmogenesis (2009)
 Terrestrial Exiled - Duodecimal Levorotation Single (2011)
 Obscura - Omnivium (2011)
 Timewarp (solo album) (2011)
 Spawn of Possession - Incurso (2012)
 Paradox - Tales of the Weird (2012)
 Beyond The Wall Of Sleep (solo album) (2014)
 Alkaloid - The Malkuth Grimoire (2015)
 Eternity's End - The Fire Within (2016)
 Alkaloid - Liquid Anatomy (2018)
 Eternity's End - Unyielding (2019)
 Path of the Hero (solo album) (2020)
 Obscura - A Valediction (2021)
 Eternity’s End - Embers of War'' (2021)

References

1981 births
21st-century guitarists
21st-century German male musicians
Death metal musicians
German heavy metal guitarists
German male guitarists
Lead guitarists
Living people
Musicians with dystonia
Necrophagist members
Obscura (band) members
Seven-string guitarists